Major-General Sir Cecil Edward Pereira,  (24 July 1869 – 26 October 1942) was a British Army officer who commanded the 2nd Division during the First World War.

Military career
Educated at the Oratory School, Edgbaston, Pereira was commissioned into the Coldstream Guards in 1890. He served in Uganda from 1898 and was seconded for service in the Second Boer War in South Africa in March 1900, and attached to the Rhodesian Field Force. He then served in the First World War and was appointed Commanding Officer of 2nd Battalion Coldstream Guards in 1914, commander of 85th Brigade (which he led at the Battle of Loos) in 1915 and commander of 1st Guards Brigade in January 1916, before being made General Officer Commanding 2nd Division in December 1916. After the war he became General Officer Commanding 56th (London) Infantry Division from 1919 until his retirement in 1923.

During the Second World War Pereira commanded the Local Defence Volunteers in London.

Family
In 1903 Pereira married Helen Mary Josephine (Nellie) Lane Fox; they had three sons and two daughters. His brothers were George Pereira, a soldier and explorer, and Edward Pereira, a priest, schoolmaster and cricketer. He settled after 1924 at Caversham Place, near Reading, a house designed for him by Clough Williams-Ellis.

Correspondence
His letters were edited by his grandson, E.A. Pereira & others, as Catholic General: The Private Wartime Correspondence of Maj-Gen Sir Cecil Edward Pereira, 1914–19 (Helion, 2020).

References

|-

1869 births
1942 deaths
British Army generals of World War I
Coldstream Guards officers
British Army personnel of the Second Boer War
Commanders of the Order of the Crown (Belgium)
Companions of the Order of St Michael and St George
English people of Portuguese descent
British Home Guard officers
Knights Commander of the Order of the Bath
People educated at The Oratory School
Recipients of the Croix de Guerre 1914–1918 (France)
British Army major generals